Yaniet Marrero López (born 4 April 1983) is a Cuban chess player who holds the FIDE title of Woman Grandmaster (WGM). She won the Women's Cuban Chess Championship in 2011.

At the 2010 Women's Chess Olympiad she won an individual gold medal thanks to her rating performance of 2511 playing on board three for the Cuban team, which finished fourth.

Marrero Lopez competed in the Women's World Chess Championship 2015: she knocked out in the first round Grandmaster Elina Danielian to reach round two, where she was eliminated by International Master Meri Arabidze.

References

External links 

Yaniet Marrero Lopez chess games at 365Chess.com

1983 births
Living people
Chess woman grandmasters
Cuban female chess players
Chess Olympiad competitors
Place of birth missing (living people)